Heinrich Müller may refer to:

 Heinrich Müller (cyclist) (born 1926), Swiss cyclist
 Heinrich Müller (footballer, born 1888) (1888–1957), Swiss football player and manager
 Heinrich Müller (footballer, born 1909) (1909–2000), Austrian football player and coach
 Heinrich Müller (Gestapo) (1900–1945?), head of the Nazi Gestapo, 1939–1945
 Heinrich Müller (physiologist) (1820–1864), anatomist and physiologist
 Heinrich Müller (theologian) (1631–1675), Lutheran theologian
 Heinrich Anton Müller (1869–1930), Swiss painter

Fiction 
A television series character

See also 
 Heini Müller (footballer, born 1934), German footballer
 Henry Miller (disambiguation)